Olonets is a town in the Republic of Karelia, Russia

Olonets may also refer to:
Olonets Governorate, a governorate of the Russian Empire
Olonets Viceroyalty, a viceroyalty of the Russian Empire bordering Vologda Viceroyalty
Olonets Oblast, a division of the Russian Empire, originally in Novgorod Viceroyalty
Olonets Isthmus, an isthmus in Russia between Lakes Onega and Ladoga
Olonets Group, another name for Aunus Group, a formation of the Finnish Army during the Continuation War
Olonets Karelian language, another name for the Livvi-Karelian language
Olonets subdialect, a subdialect in the group of the Northern Russian dialects